Graf Spee may refer to:

Graf Maximilian von Spee, German admiral in World War I

or to several German ships that were named after the admiral:
 SMS Graf Spee, incomplete Mackensen-class battlecruiser of World War I, scrapped in 1923
 The German cruiser Admiral Graf Spee, launched in 1934, that saw action in World War II
 HMS Flamingo, later renamed Graf Spee, a former Royal Navy Black Swan-class sloop used as a Bundesmarine training ship